{{Speciesbox 
| image = Rhododendron selense ssp. jucundum - University of Copenhagen Botanical Garden - DSC07581.JPG
| image_caption = Rhododendron selense ssp. jucundum
| genus = Rhododendron
| species = selense
| authority = Franch.
| subdivision_ranks = Subspecies
| subdivision = See text.
| synonyms =
Of R. selense subsp. dasycladum:
Rhododendron dasycladum Balf.f. & W.W.Sm.Rhododendron dolerum Balf.f. & Forrest
Rhododendron rhaibocarpum Balf.f. & W.W.Sm.
Of R. selense subsp. jucundum:Rhododendron jucundum Balf.f. & W.W.Sm.Rhododendron blandulum Balf.f. & W.W.Sm.
Of R. selense subsp. selense:Rhododendron axium Balf.f. & ForrestRhododendron chalarocladum Balf.f. & ForrestRhododendron metrium ForrestRhododendron nanothamnum Balf.f. & ForrestRhododendron pagophyllum Balf.f. & Kingdon-WardRhododendron probum Balf.f. & Forrest
The flowers are pink.

It is best seen in its native habitat, where many thousands of plants can be seen flowering during April and May. In cultivation it takes several years to flower.

TaxonomyRhododendron selense was first described by Adrien René Franchet in 1898.

Subspecies
Three subspecies are recognized:Rhododendron selense subsp. dasycladum (Balf.f. & W.W.Sm.) D.F.Chamb.Rhododendron selense subsp. jucundum (Balf.f. & W.W.Sm.) D.F.Chamb.Rhododendron selense subsp. selenseConservation
In 1998, Rhododendron dasycladum was assessed as "vulnerable" and said to be an endemic of a single mountain in Yunnan, China. , this species is regarded one of the synonyms of Rh. selense subsp. dasycladum, which has a much wider distribution in eastern Tibet, southwestern Sichuan and northwestern Yunnan.

 References 

"Rhododendron selense", Franchet, J. Bot. (Morot)''. 12: 257. 1898.
Flora of China
Hirsutum.com

selense